Minden Township may refer to the following townships in the United States:

 Minden Township, Pottawattamie County, Iowa
 Minden Township, Michigan
 Minden Township, Benton County, Minnesota

See also: Minden (disambiguation)

Township name disambiguation pages